The Mexican professional wrestling promotion Consejo Mundial de Lucha Libre (CMLL) has traditionally held an annual Reyes del Aire (Spanish for "Kings of the Air") tournament since 2005. There was no tournament in 2010 and both 2007 and 2012 saw two Reyes del Aire tournaments. The tournament includes a varying number of wrestlers, competing in a Torneo cibernetico match, essentially a multi-man elimination match with the last competitor remaining is declared that year's Rey del Aire and is given a trophy. CMLL holds a similar tournament for their Mini-Estrella division called Pequeños Reyes del Aire ("Little Kings of the Air"). Being a professional wrestling tournament, it is not won legitimately; it is instead won via predetermined outcomes to the matches that are kept secret from the general public.

The tournament normally features low and mid-card wrestlers who work a "High flying" style, hence the name "Kings of the Air" but has at times featured more wrestlers closer to the main event or closer to the low card positions. The winner gets a trophy, but there is no other tangible reward for winning the match other than the increased recognition, they are not awarded with a championship match or anything else of that nature. There have been eighteen tournaments so far, with three wrestlers winning more than one tournament; Volador Jr. has won three tournaments in total while Ángel de Oro and Valiente has won two. Ángel de Oro is the only wrestler to win consecutive tournaments as he won both the 2011 and the first 2012 Reyes del Aire tournaments. A total of 85 luchadors have appeared in the eighteen tournaments so far, with Valiente and Stuka Jr. having appeared in ten out of those. Five men have participated under two different ring identities, in some cases without the previous identity being acknowledged. Niebla Roja has appeared both under that name and his previous identity, Ángel de Plata. Dragón Rojo Jr. appeared as Diamante Negro, before being given his current ring character. Metálico worked as Tigre Metálico in the very first Reyes del Aire and opening match worker Bengala also participated in the 2007 tournament as Sombra de Plata. The only one where the name change has been publicly acknowledged was Flash adopting the identity of Fuego. The youngest tournament winner was La Sombra, who was 18 years old when he won the 2013 Reyes del Aire and he is also the youngest participant overall. Virus is the oldest Reyes del Aire, winning the second tournament in 2007 at the age of 38, with his participation in the 2012 Reyes del Aire he also became the oldest overall competitor at 43 years of age.

Reyes del Aire winners

Reyes del Aire tournament participants

CMLL Reyes del Aire 2005

The first-ever Reyes del Aire tournament took place on Friday, June 10, 2005, as part of CMLL's Friday Night Super Viernes show. The tournament format was a torneo cibernetico, a multi-man elimination match with eight participants. The tournament primarily featured younger, lower-ranked wrestlers including Alan Stone, Leono, Ricky Marvin, Misterioso Jr., Stuka Jr., Tigre Blanco, Tigre Metálico, Virus and Volador Jr. During the match Alan Stone and Virus eliminated each other when both men's shoulders were on the mat during the three counts. Volador Jr. pinned Misterioso Jr. to become the first Rey del Aire.

Reyes del Aire 2005 order of elimination

CMLL Reyes del Aire 2006

The second annual Reyes del Aire tournament took place on Sunday June 18, 2006 on CMLL's weekly Arena Mexico show. The tournament format was a torneo cibernetico, multi-man elimination match with ten participants. The tournament primarily featured younger, lower ranked wrestlers including Danger, Leono, Loco Max, Máscara Purpura, La Mascara, Neutron, Oro II, Tony Rivera, Stuka Jr. and Valiente. During the match Stuka Jr. and Máscara Purpura were eliminated at the same time, counted out of the ring after a dive from Máscara Purpura went wrong. It was never revealed if this was a true accident or part of the plan laid out for the match. In the end La Mascara pinned Neutron to win the match in 18:09.

Reyes del Aire 2006 order of elimination

CMLL Reyes del Aire 2007 Arena Mexico

The third annual Reyes del Aire tournament took place on February 16, 2007 on CMLL's weekly Super Viernes show. The tournament format was a torneo cibernetico, multi-man elimination match with sixteen participants. The tournament featured a mix of lower ranked and mid to top level wrestlers including Alex Koslov, Averno, El Felino, El Sagrado, La Mascara, Leono, Mephisto, Metro, Misterioso Jr., Sangre Azteca, Sombra de Plata, Stuka Jr., Súper Nova, Valiente, Virus and Volador Jr. During the match Alex Koslov and El Felino ended up eliminating each other when both people had their shoulders on the canvas during the pinfall. Volador Jr. pinned Sangre Azteca to become the first person to win two Reyes del Aire tournaments.

Reyes del Aire 2007 Arena Mexico order of elimination

CMLL Reyes del Aire 2007 Arena Coliseo

CMLL broke with tradition and held a second Reyes del Aire tournament in 2007, this time in Arena Coliseo, CMLL's secondary Mexico City arena. The second tournament generally featured wrestlers from the low and mid-card ranks, with less established names than the first 2007 tournament. The participants included Ángel Azteca Jr., Astro Boy, Euforia, Loco Max, Metálico, Nosferatu, Skándalo, Stuka Jr., Súper Nova, Trueno, Valiente and Virus. The order of elimination is unclear or undocumented, but Virus pinned Valiente to win the Reyes del Aire Tournament.

Reyes del Aire 2007 Arena Coliseo order of elimination

CMLL Reyes del Aire 2008

The fifth overall Reyes del Aire tournament took place on Saturday May 9, 2008 on CMLL's weekly show in Arena Mexico. The tournament format was a torneo cibernetico, multi-man elimination match with fifteen participants, the first tournament with uneven sides. The tournament featured a mix of lower ranked and mid to top level wrestlers including Diamante Negro, Ephesto, Euforia, Flash, La Mascara, La Sombra, Loco Max, Máscara Purpura, Misterioso Jr., Mr. Águila, Sangre Azteca, Stuka Jr., Valiente and former tournament winners Virus and Volador Jr. During the match Volador Jr. and Mr. Águila eliminated each other at the same time, with Valiente pinning Sagre Azteca for the final elimination to win the 2008 tournament.

Reyes del Aire 2008 order of elimination

CMLL Reyes del Aire 2009

The 2009 Reyes del Aire tournament was held on October 12 and was the first tournament held outside Mexico City, instead taking place in Puebla, Puebla, Mexico instead. Unlike previous years this tournament also saw the participation of some competitors that did not use the high flying style Reyes del Aire usually focuses on, such as Averno, Ephesto,  Mephisto and El Texano Jr. The tournament format was a torneo cibernetico, multi-man elimination match with twelve participants. The tournament featured a mix of mid to top level wrestlers including Averno, Black Warrior, El Sagrado, El Texano Jr., Ephesto, Flash, La Mascara, Máscara Dorada, Mephisto, Sangre Azteca, Valiente, Volador Jr. In the early portions of the match Sangre Azteca and Máscara Dorada eliminated each other when both sets of shoulders touched the ground during the pinfall. In the end Volador Jr. eliminated Averno and Mephisto, the two highest ranked wrestlers in the tournament.

Reyes del Aire 2009 order of elimination

CMLL Reyes del Aire 2011

After not having a tournament in 2010 CMLL brought the tournament back for 2011, holding their seventh tournament on January 1, 2011 back in Arena Mexico once again. That year's tournament featured wrestlers from the low to mid card, with no established headliner names involved. The tournament format was a torneo cibernetico, multi-man elimination match with sixteen participant, which at the time was the highest number of participants. Guerrero Maya Jr. was originally slated to participate, but had to be replaced due to illness while Pegasso had to be replaced due to a knee injury. The competitors included Ángel de Oro, Ángel de Plata, Arkangel de la Muerte, Cancerbero, Delta, Diamante, Escorpión, Fuego, Molotov (replacement), Pólvora, Puma King, Raziel, Rey Cometa, Sensei (replacement), Tiger Kid, Virus. During the match Arkangel de la Muerte and Ángel de Plata eliminated each other during a double pinfall. In the end Ángel de Oro eliminated former Reyes del Aire tournament winner Virus to win the 2011 tournament.

Reyes del Aire 2011 order of elimination

CMLL Reyes del Aire 2012 Mexico City

CMLL held their eight Reyes del Aire tournament on February 3, 2012 in Arena Mexico as part that week's Super Viernes Show. The torneo cibernetico featured 18 wrestlers in total, the highest number of the tournaments so far. The tournament featured high fliers from the mid to high card position and included Ángel de Oro, Delta, Euforia, Fuego, Guerrero Maya Jr., Hijo del Signo, Máscara Dorada, Mr. Águila, Pólvora, Puma King, Raziel, Rey Escorpión, Stuka Jr., Tiger, Titán, Valiente, Virus. In the end Mr. Águila and Máscara Dorada pinned each other, leaving Ángel de Oro alone in the match, the first competitor to win the match without having to eliminate the last competitor. The victory made Ángel de Oro the first and so far only wrestler to win back-to-back Reyes del Aire tournament.

Reyes del Aire 2012 Mexico City order of elimination

CMLL Reyes del Aire 2012 Guadalajara

Like in 2007 CMLL decided to hold two Reyes del Aire tournaments in 2012, one in Arena Mexico and one in Puebla, Puebla, the same pattern they had for the 2012 Pequeños Reyes del Aire tournaments. The Arena Puebla version of the 2012 Reyes del Aire tournament was originally slated to include Tritón but on the night of the show he was replaced by Titán with no official explanation given. The torneo cibernetico featured twelve wrestlers in total, including the first ever Reyes del Aire tournament appearance of the Místico character, both the original Místico and Místico La Nueva Era. The twelve competitors were Ángel de Oro, Averno, Dragón Rojo Jr., Euforia, La Mascara, Máscara Dorada, Mephisto, Místico, Niebla Roja, Rey Escorpión, Titán, Valiente. The match ended when Dragón Rojo Jr. was disqualified for pulling Valiente's mask off during the match. This made Valiente the third wrestler to ever win more than one Reyes del Aire tournament.

Reyes del Aire 2012 Puebla order of elimination

CMLL Reyes del Aire 2013

The 2013 Reyes del Aire tournament took place over three CMLL Super Viernes events from February 1 to February 15, and included 32 wrestlers in total. The 2013 event marked the first time so many wrestlers participated in the tournament, as well as the first time the tournament was not a one night event. CMLL had two preliminary Torneo cibernetico elimination matches to find the finalists for the February 15th show. La Sombra won the "Group A" cibernetico and Volador Jr. won the second one to qualify for the finals. In the finals La Sombra defeated long time rival Volador Jr. to take the 2013 tournament, his first tournament victory ever.

Reyes del Aire 2013 order of elimination

CMLL Reyes del Aire 2014

In 2014 CMLL held their first Reyes del Aire tournament of the year on April 27, making it the eleventh overall tournament and the first of at least two tournaments they would hold in 2014. The torneo cibernetico featured a total of 12 wrestlers competing for the trophy. The elimination match lasted more than 30 minutes and featured the team of Delta, Guerrero Maya Jr., Rey Cometa, Stuka Jr., Tritón and Valiente facing off against the team of Averno, Ephesto, Mephisto, Niebla Roja, Puma and Tiger. In the end Stuka Jr. eliminated both Averno and Mephisto to win the tournament.

Reyes del Aire 2014 (Mexico City) order of elimination

CMLL Reyes del Aire 2014 Puebla

CMLL held a second Reyes del Aire tournament in 2014, holding the second version on August 4, 2014 in Arena Puebla in Puebla, Puebla, Mexico. The field was the smallest field for a Reyes del Aire since 2006 with only 10 participants. The teams were divided cleanly between the tecnico (good guy) and rudo ("Bad guy") factions. The tecnico side consisted of Ángel de Oro, Dragón Rojo Jr., Máscara Dorada, Stigma and Stuka Jr., while the rudos were represented by Gran Guerrero, Misterioso Jr., Puma, Rey Escorpión and Ripper. The main storylines going into the show focused primarily on Rey Escorpión and Dragón Rojo Jr. who up until the summer of 2014 had been allies in a group called Los Revolucionarios del Terror until Dragón Rojo Jr. left the group and turned tecnico. In the end Rey Escorpión pinned Máscara Dorada for the final elimination, winning the tournament for the first time.

Reyes del Aire 2014 Puebla order of elimination

CMLL Reyes del Aire 2015 

The 2015 CMLL Reyes del Aire ("Kings of the Air") tournament took place on May 1, 2015, as part of their Super Viernes show. This was the 13th overall Reyes de Aire tournament and the 10th held in Arena Mexico. The participants were La Sombra, Ángel de Oro, Delta, Guerrero Maya Jr., Dragon Lee, Stuka Jr., Tritón, Fuego, Niebla Roja, Gran Guerrero, Bárbaro Cavernario, Kamaitachi, Misterioso Jr., Virus, Tiger and Puma. La Sombra ended up winning the tournament.

CMLL Reyes del Aire 2016

The 2016 CMLL Reyes del Aire (Spanish for "Kings of the Air") tournament was a professional wrestling tournament, produced and scripted by the Mexican Lucha Libre promotion Consejo Mundial de Lucha Libre (CMLL) which took place over two shows, on September 23 and September 30, 2016. This was the 14th overall Reyes de Aire tournament and the 11th held in Arena Mexico. The show aired as part of CMLL's week television on subsequent weeks. The 2016 Reyes del Aire was sponsored by the Mexican ESTO newspaper, commemorating their 75th anniversary. Volador Jr. and Cavernario outlasted Mistico, Negro Casas, La Máscara, Dragon Lee, Máximo Sexy, Mephisto, Valiente, Euforia, Máscara Dorada and Dragón Rojo Jr. to qualify for the finals of the Reyes del Aire tournament. The following week Cavernario tricked Volador Jr. into hitting the referee and thus won the match and the tournament by disqualification.

Super Luchas September 23, 2016

Super Luchas September 30, 2016

Reyes del Aire 2016 order of elimination

CMLL Reyes del Aire 2017

The Reyes del Aire (Spanish for "Kings of the Air") is an annual professional wrestling tournament promoted and scripted by the Mexican Consejo Mundial de Lucha Libre (CMLL) professional wrestling promotion . The one-night tournament was held on April 7, 2017 at Arena Mexico in Mexico City, CMLL's main venue. The tournament was a 16-man torneo cibernetico elimination tournament, which was the main event of that week's Super Viernes show. The Reyes de Aire tournament was first held in 2005, with the 2017 Reyes del Aire being the 15th overall tournament held

For the 2017 version of the tournament CMLL booked a total of 16 wrestlers in a torneo cibernetico elimination match, with 8 tecnicos (those that portray the good guys in wrestling) facing off against a team of 8 rudos (the "Bad guys"). The tecnico side was represented by Ángel de Oro, Carístico, Dragon Lee, Máximo Sexy, Místico, Titán, Valiente, and Volador Jr., while the rudo team consisted of Bárbaro Cavernario, Euforia, Gran Guerrero, Hechicero, Luciferno, La Máscara, Mephisto, and Niebla Roja. Ephesto was originally slated to be part of the rudo team, but had to be replaced by Luciferno in the week leading up to the show due contracting a blood infection that required surgery. Of the 16 competitors Volador Jr. had previously won the Reyes del Aire tournament three times, Valiente and Ángel de Oro had won it twice, while Bárbaro Cavernario and La Máscara had won the tournament once prior to 2017.

The match started with the first two competitors in the ring, the two wrestlers who are next in the rotation were on the apron and the remaining eight wrestlers were on the floor on their respective sides of the ring. The first elimination came at 6:14 when Volador Jr. pinned Luciferno, giving the tecnico side a six-on-five advantage. At 10:15 Bárbaro Cavernario pinned Titán to even the sides. At one point Dragon Lee and Mephisto collided mid ring, allowing Hechicero to pin Dragon Lee while Volador Jr. pinned Mephisto at the same time for a double elimination. Late in the match Volador Jr. and Carístico bumped into each other during the match and started to argue and push each other around despite being on the same team. The argument was broken up by Místico to allow the match to continue. In the final minutes of the elimination match Volador Jr., Euforia and Ángel de Oro were all in the ring at the same time for the final segment of the match. Euforia forced Volador Jr. to submit, followed by Ángel de Oro quickly pinning Euforia to win the match and become a three time Rey del Aire winner.

Reyes del Aire 2017 order of elimination.

CMLL Reyes del Aire 2019

The Reyes del Aire 2019 (Spanish for "Kings of the Air") is the sixteenth edition of an annual professional wrestling tournament promoted and scripted by the Mexican professional wrestling promotion Consejo Mundial de Lucha Libre (CMLL). The one-night tournament was held on January 6, 2019 at Arena Mexico in Mexico City, CMLL's main venue. The Reyes de Aire tournament was first held in 2005, and held on a near-annual basis, most recently in 2017. The event was part of CMLL's annual Three Kings' day celebrations.

For the 2019 version of the tournament CMLL booked a total of 16 wrestlers in a torneo cibernetico elimination match, with 8 tecnicos (those that portray the good guys in wrestling) facing off against a team of 8 rudos (the "Bad guys"). The tecnico side was represented by Audaz, Black Panther, Drone, Esfinge, Flyer, Rey Cometa, Tritón and Titán. The rudo side consisted of Kawato-San, Pólvora, Sagrado, Templario, Tiger, Universo 2000 Jr., Vangellys, and Virus.  Titán won the tournament by lastly eliminating Templario, marking the first time Titán has won the Reyes del Aire tournament,

Reyes del Aire 2019 order of elimination.

CMLL Reyes del Aire 2020

The Reyes del Aire 2020 (Spanish for "Kings of the Air") was the seventeenth edition of the annual Reyes el Aire professional wrestling tournament, produced and scripted by the Mexican professional wrestling promotion Consejo Mundial de Lucha Libre (CMLL). The one-night tournament was held on January 14, 2020 at Arena México in Mexico City, CMLL's main venue. The tournament was a 12-man torneo cibernetico elimination tournament, which was the semi-main event of that week's Martes Arena México show. The Reyes de Aire tournament was first held in 2005.

For the 2020 version of the tournament CMLL booked a total of 12 wrestlers in a torneo cibernetico elimination match, with 6 tecnicos (those that portray the good guys in wrestling) facing off against a team of 6 rudos (the "Bad guys"). The tecnico side was represented by Black Panther, Drone, Esfinge, Príncipe Diamante, Rey Cometa, and Star Jr. while the rudo side consisted of Akuma, Disturbio, El Hijo del Signo, Kawato San, Templario, and Virus. Templario won the tournament by lastly eliminating Star Jr.

Reyes del Aire 2020 order of elimination.

CMLL Reyes del Aire 2022 VIP

The Reyes del Aire (2022 VIP) (Spanish for "Kings of the Air") was the eighteenth edition of the annual Reyes el Aire professional wrestling tournament, produced and scripted by the Mexican professional wrestling promotion Consejo Mundial de Lucha Libre (CMLL). The one-night tournament was held on January 28, 2022 at Arena México in Mexico City, CMLL's main venue. The tournament was a 10-man torneo cibernetico elimination tournament, which was the semi-main event of that week's Super Viernes show. The Reyes de Aire tournament was first held in 2005.

The participants were Atlantis Jr., Dragon Rojo Jr., El Barbaro Cavernario, El Soberano Jr., Gran Guerrero, Negro Casas, Stuka Jr., Templario, Titán and Volador Jr. The match ended in a disqualification after Atlantis Jr. tore Stuka Jr.'s mask off.

Reyes del Aire 2022 VIP order of elimination

Footnotes

References

2005 in professional wrestling
2006 in professional wrestling
2007 in professional wrestling
2008 in professional wrestling
2009 in professional wrestling
2011 in professional wrestling
2012 in professional wrestling
2013 in professional wrestling
2014 in professional wrestling
2015 in professional wrestling
2016 in professional wrestling
2017 in professional wrestling
Lucha libre
Consejo Mundial de Lucha Libre tournaments
Recurring events established in 2005